"Blue Turns to Grey" is a song that was written by Mick Jagger and Keith Richards. The song first appeared in February 1965 when both Dick and Dee Dee and The Mighty Avengers released versions of it as singles. Another version was released shortly thereafter by Tracey Dey on Amy Records. On Dey's single, the label credits the song to "K. Richard-A. Oldham"—Oldham being the surname of the Rolling Stones' then-manager/producer Andrew Loog Oldham. It was released by The Rolling Stones on their 1965 US-only album December's Children (And Everybody's) later that year. On this album, "Blue Turns to Grey" as well as "The Singer Not the Song" features Brian Jones on a 12-string electric guitar and Keith on a 6-string. It did not see a UK release until the 1971 compilation album Stone Age.

When Cliff Richard and the Shadows released their version as a single in March 1966 it became a hit in a number of countries. In the UK it reached number 15.

Rolling Stones version

Personnel
 Mick Jagger - lead vocals
 Keith Richards - electric guitar, backing vocals
 Brian Jones - electric guitar
 Bill Wyman - bass guitar
 Charlie Watts - drums

Cliff Richard and the Shadows version

Chart performance

Other cover versions
Flamin' Groovies released a version of the song on their 1978 album, Flamin' Groovies Now

References

1965 songs
1965 singles
1966 singles
Songs written by Jagger–Richards
The Rolling Stones songs
Dick and Dee Dee songs
Cliff Richard songs
Warner Records singles
Columbia Graphophone Company singles
Song recordings produced by Norrie Paramor